Shade is a studio album by Holly Cole. It was released in Canada in 2003 on Alert Records.

Track listing

 "Heatwave" (Berlin) – 3:40
 "Something Cool" (Barnes) – 3:58
 "Too Darn Hot" (Porter) – 3:13
 "God Only Knows" (Asher, Wilson) – 4:27
 "A Cottage for Sale" (Conley, Robison) – 3:43
 "We Kiss in a Shadow" (Hammerstein, Rodgers) – 2:26
 "It Never Entered My Mind" (Hart, Rodgers) – 4:26
 "Manhattan" (Hart, Rodgers) – 3:58
 "Moonglow" (DeLange, Hudson, Mills) – 4:21
 "Almost Like Being in Love" (Lerner, Loewe) – 4:03
 "Midnight Sun" (Burke, Hampton, Mercer) – 5:14
 "Lazy Afternoon" (Latouche, Moross) – 3:07

Personnel
 David Piltch – bass
 George Koller – bass
 Mark Kelso – drums, bongos, percussion
 Johnny Johnson – flute, alto saxophone, tenor saxophone, bass clarinet
 Dylan Heming – organ
 Davide Direnzo – bongos
 Aaron Davis – piano
 Terry Promane – tenor trombone, bass trombone
 Kevin Breit – guitar, loops, mandolin
 Guido Basso – trumpet, flugelhorn
 Holly Cole – vocals, xylophone, glockenspiel

References

Holly Cole albums
2003 albums
Alert Records albums